{{DISPLAYTITLE:C13H17N3O}}
The molecular formula C13H17N3O (molar mass: 231.29 g/mol, exact mass: 231.1372 u) may refer to:

 AL-38022A
 Aminophenazone, or aminopyrine
 PNU-91356A (U-91356)